The Providence Friars represented Providence College in Women's Hockey East Association play during the 2014–15 NCAA Division I women's ice hockey season.

Offseason
August 20: Four Providence Grads were drafted by the Boston Blades of the CWHL, including Janine Weber '14, Laura Veharanta '12, Rebecca Morse '14 and Corinne Buie '14.

Recruiting

Roster

Schedule

|-
!colspan=12 style=""| Regular Season

|-
!colspan=12 style=""| WHEA Tournament

Awards and honors
Beth Hanrahan wins Hockey East Best Sportsman Award 
13 Women's hockey players won Hockey East All Scholastic honors

Miscellaneous
Janine Weber ('14) becoame the first player to sign with the newly inaugurated NWHL, with the New York Riveters.

References

Providence
Providence Friars women's ice hockey